The Near Earth Object Survey TELescope (NEOSTEL - also known as "Flyeye") is an astronomical survey and early-warning system for detecting near-Earth objects sized  and above a few weeks before they impact Earth.

NEOSTEL is a project founded by the European Space Agency (ESA), starting with an initial prototype currently under construction at OHB in Italy. The telescope is of a new "fly-eye" design inspired by the wide field of vision from a fly's eye. When complete it will have one of the widest fields of view of any telescope and be able to survey the majority of the visible sky in a single night. If the initial prototype is successful, three more telescopes are planned, in complementary positions around the globe close to the equator.

In terms of light gathering power, the size of the primary mirror is not directly comparable to more conventional telescopes because of the novel design, but is equivalent to a conventional 1-metre telescope and should have a limiting magnitude of around 21.

The project is part of the NEO Segment of ESA's Space Situational Awareness Programme. The telescope itself should be complete by end of 2019, and installation on Mount Mufara, Sicily should be complete in 2020, having been agreed with the Italian Space Agency in October 2018. Development of the telescope was reported as on track in Feb 2019.

Optics 

The fly eye aspect of the telescope refers to the use of compound optics, as opposed to the single set of optics used in a conventional telescope. Classically, telescopes were designed around a single human observer looking through an eye piece. Astrographs were developed in the 19th century where a photographic plate, or later a CCD, records the image, which a human observer can then view. With the human eye no longer directly observing the image there is no longer a restriction on a single viewing point, and asteroid detection software has become fully automated, so a human observer need not view the majority of images at all. 

Light enters the NEOSTEL telescope through the aperture and is reflected off the primary mirror onto a secondary, consisting of 16 mirrors arranged on a hexadecagonal pyramid. The split beam then passes into 16 separate aspheric lenses and on to 16 corresponding CCD image sensors. NEOSTEL uses the 16 CCD cameras to view 45 square degrees of light entering the telescope aperture. The pixel scale is 1.5 arc seconds per pixel across the whole field of view.

Observatory 

NEOSTEL's detection capabilities and the quality of service it requires (in particular, the use of a fast slewing equatorial mount) mean that a standard telescope dome and observatory design will not be sufficient. Work has been carried out on optimizing the design of the infrastructure layout to solve these problems, whilst minimising the impact of the infrastructure on the environment in Madonie Regional Natural Park, where Monte Mufara is situated.

See also 
 List of near-Earth object observation projects
 Asteroid Terrestrial-impact Last Alert System
 Asteroid impact prediction

References

External links 

 GAL Hassin: Ente Parco delle Madonie: sì al progetto dell’Osservatorio su Monte Mufara 

Optical telescopes
Astronomical surveys
Asteroid surveys
Near-Earth object tracking